The 1993–94 NBA season was the 26th season for the Seattle SuperSonics in the National Basketball Association. During the off-season, the Sonics acquired All-Star forward Detlef Schrempf from the Indiana Pacers, and acquired Kendall Gill from the Charlotte Hornets. In their third season with George Karl as head coach, the Sonics got off to a fast start winning their first ten games on their way to a 26–3 start, and later holding a league best 35–10 record  at the All-Star break. The team won 17 of their final 19 games finishing the season with a franchise best 63–19 record, and made the Playoffs as the #1 seed in the Western Conference for the first time since the 1978–79 season, where the SuperSonics won their first NBA Championship.

Shawn Kemp and Gary Payton were both selected for the 1994 NBA All-Star Game, which was Payton's first All-Star appearance, and Karl was selected to coach the Western Conference. Kemp averaged 18.1 points, 10.8 rebounds, 1.8 steals and 2.1 blocks per game, and was named to the All-NBA Second Team, while Payton averaged 16.5 points, 6.0 assists  and 2.3 steals per game, and was named to the All-NBA Third Team, and to the NBA All-Defensive First Team. In addition, Schrempf provided the team with 15.0 points and 5.6 rebounds per game, while Ricky Pierce averaged 14.5 points per game off the bench, but only played 51 games due to a left foot injury. Gill contributed 14.1 points and 1.9 steals per game, while Sam Perkins provided with 12.3 points per game, and defensive sixth man Nate McMillan led the league with 3.0 steals per game off the bench, and was named to the NBA All-Defensive Second Team. Payton finished in sixth place in Most Valuable Player voting, and Kemp finished tied in seventh place, while McMillan finished in second place in Sixth Man of the Year voting. Payton also finished in fifth place in Defensive Player of the Year voting, and in third place in Most Improved Player voting.

In the Western Conference First Round of the NBA Playoffs, the Sonics faced off against the 8th-seeded Denver Nuggets. However, after taking a 2–0 series lead, the Sonics would not make it past the first round, losing to the Nuggets in five games, with a 98–94 Game 5 home loss in overtime. It was the first time in NBA Playoffs history that a number 8 seed defeated a number 1 seeded team.

Following the season, Pierce was traded to the Golden State Warriors after feuding with Payton, and Michael Cage signed as a free agent with the Cleveland Cavaliers.

Offseason

Draft picks

Roster

1993–94 Salaries

Sources:
 Basketball Reference: 1993-94 SEA Salaries

Regular season

Season standings

Record vs. opponents

Game log

|- align="center" bgcolor="#ccffcc"
| 1
| November 6
| L.A. Lakers
| 
| Shawn Kemp (30)
| Shawn Kemp (14)
| Nate McMillan (11)
| Seattle Center Coliseum14,813
| 1–0
|- align="center" bgcolor="#ccffcc"
| 2
| November 8
| @ Utah
| 
| Ricky Pierce (16)
| Michael Cage (7)
| Gary Payton (6)
| Delta Center19,911
| 2–0
|- align="center" bgcolor="#ccffcc"
| 3
| November 9
| Denver
| 
| Sam Perkins (28)
| Shawn Kemp (11)
| Detlef Schrempf (8)
| Seattle Center Coliseum14,253
| 3–0
|- align="center" bgcolor="#ccffcc"
| 4
| November 11
| Cleveland
| 
| Schrempf & Pierce (22)
| Shawn Kemp (9)
| Nate McMillan (6)
| Seattle Center Coliseum14,813
| 4–0
|- align="center" bgcolor="#ccffcc"
| 5
| November 13
| Atlanta
| 
| Sam Perkins (22)
| Shawn Kemp (13)
| Nate McMillan (8)
| Seattle Center Coliseum14,813
| 5–0
|- align="center" bgcolor="#ccffcc"
| 6
| November 16
| Chicago
| 
| Ricky Pierce (19)
| Shawn Kemp (7)
| Nate McMillan (10)
| Seattle Center Coliseum14,813
| 6–0
|- align="center" bgcolor="#ccffcc"
| 7
| November 19
| Dallas
| 
| Shawn Kemp (24)
| Shawn Kemp (9)
| Kemp & Gill (5)
| Seattle Center Coliseum14,253
| 7–0
|- align="center" bgcolor="#ccffcc"
| 8
| November 20
| @ Golden State
| 
| Shawn Kemp (28)
| Shawn Kemp (12)
| McMillan & Payton (7)
| Oakland-Alameda County Coliseum Arena15,025
| 8–0
|- align="center" bgcolor="#ccffcc"
| 9
| November 24
| @ Sacramento
| 
| Gary Payton (23)
| Shawn Kemp (15)
| Nate McMillan (11)
| ARCO Arena17,317
| 9–0
|- align="center" bgcolor="#ccffcc"
| 10
| November 26
| @ Minnesota
| 
| Ricky Pierce (28)
| Sam Perkins (9)
| Nate McMillan (11)
| Target Center18,298
| 10–0
|- align="center" bgcolor="#ffcccc"
| 11
| November 27
| @ Cleveland
| 
| Payton & Kemp (26)
| Shawn Kemp (14)
| Nate McMillan (7)
| Richfield Coliseum20,273
| 10–1
|- align="center" bgcolor="#ccffcc"
| 12
| November 30
| @ Philadelphia
| 
| Sam Perkins (21)
| Shawn Kemp (15)
| Gill & Payton (7)
| The Spectrum13,193
| 11–1

|- align="center" bgcolor="#ccffcc"
| 13
| December 2
| @ Washington
| 
| Gill & Payton (18)
| Sam Perkins (8)
| Gary Payton (6)
| US Airways Arena18,756
| 12–1
|- align="center" bgcolor="#ccffcc"
| 14
| December 4
| Minnesota
| 
| Sam Perkins (22)
| Shawn Kemp (10)
| Detlef Schrempf (5)
| Seattle Center Coliseum14,693
| 13–1
|- align="center" bgcolor="#ccffcc"
| 15
| December 6
| Washington
| 
| Kemp & Gill (18)
| Shawn Kemp (9)
| Gary Payton (11)
| Seattle Center Coliseum14,253
| 14–1
|- align="center" bgcolor="#ccffcc"
| 16
| December 8
| @ San Antonio
| 
| Gary Payton (25)
| Shawn Kemp (7)
| Nate McMillan (7)
| Alamodome18,184
| 15–1
|- align="center" bgcolor="#ccffcc"
| 17
| December 9
| @ Dallas
| 
| Kendall Gill (23)
| Detlef Schrempf (8)
| Nate McMillan (7)
| Reunion Arena13,112
| 16–1
|- align="center" bgcolor="#ffcccc"
| 18
| December 11
| @ Houston
| 
| Detlef Schrempf (17)
| Shawn Kemp (12)
| Gary Payton (4)
| The Summit16,611
| 16–2
|- align="center" bgcolor="#ccffcc"
| 19
| December 14
| Orlando
| 
| Ricky Pierce (24)
| Ervin Johnson (10)
| Gary Payton (9)
| Seattle Center Coliseum14,813
| 17–2
|- align="center" bgcolor="#ccffcc"
| 20
| December 17
| Milwaukee
| 
| Ricky Pierce (21)
| Ervin Johnson (9)
| Schrempf & McMillan (7)
| Seattle Center Coliseum14,258
| 18–2
|- align="center" bgcolor="#ccffcc"
| 21
| December 18
| Golden State
| 
| Ricky Pierce (26)
| Detlef Schrempf (8)
| Gary Payton (8)
| Seattle Center Coliseum14,813
| 19–2
|- align="center" bgcolor="#ccffcc"
| 22
| December 21
| Indiana
| 
| Sam Perkins (23)
| Detlef Schrempf (11)
| Nate McMillan (7)
| Seattle Center Coliseum14,580
| 20–2
|- align="center" bgcolor="#ffcccc"
| 23
| December 23
| Phoenix
| 
| Detlef Schrempf (16)
| Michael Cage (12)
| Nate McMillan (8)
| Seattle Center Coliseum14,813
| 20–3
|- align="center" bgcolor="#ccffcc"
| 24
| December 28
| Houston
| 
| Payton & Pierce (25)
| Michael Cage (11)
| Nate McMillan (9)
| Seattle Center Coliseum14,813
| 21–3
|- align="center" bgcolor="#ccffcc"
| 25
| December 29
| @ L.A. Lakers
| 
| Shawn Kemp (25)
| Michael Cage (10)
| Gary Payton (9)
| Great Western Forum15,599
| 22–3

|- align="center" bgcolor="#ccffcc"
| 26
| January 4
| @ Phoenix
| 
| Shawn Kemp (22)
| Nate McMillan (9)
| Gary Payton (8)
| America West Arena19,023
| 23–3
|- align="center" bgcolor="#ccffcc"
| 27
| January 5
| @ L.A. Clippers
| 
| Shawn Kemp (22)
| Shawn Kemp (15)
| Gary Payton (8)
| Los Angeles Sports Arena11,838
| 24–3
|- align="center" bgcolor="#ccffcc"
| 28
| January 7
| Sacramento
| 
| Detlef Schrempf (20)
| Shawn Kemp (8)
| Gary Payton (8)
| Seattle Center Coliseum14,709
| 25–3
|- align="center" bgcolor="#ccffcc"
| 29
| January 8
| Utah
| 
| Three-Way Tie (16)
| Michael Cage (9)
| Nate McMillan (10)
| Seattle Center Coliseum14,813
| 26–3
|- align="center" bgcolor="#ffcccc"
| 30
| January 11
| @ Portland
| 
| Payton & Schrempf (19)
| Gary Payton (7)
| Gary Payton (8)
| Memorial Coliseum12,888
| 26–4
|- align="center" bgcolor="#ffcccc"
| 31
| January 14
| @ Golden State
| 
| Ricky Pierce (18)
| Shawn Kemp (9)
| Nate McMillan (4)
| Oakland-Alameda County Coliseum Arena15,025
| 26–5
|- align="center" bgcolor="#ccffcc"
| 32
| January 15
| Miami
| 
| Shawn Kemp (25)
| Shawn Kemp (14)
| Payton & McMillan (4)
| Seattle Center Coliseum14,787
| 27–5
|- align="center" bgcolor="#ccffcc"
| 33
| January 18
| L.A. Lakers
| 
| Kendall Gill (19)
| Detlef Schrempf (11)
| Gary Payton (9)
| Seattle Center Coliseum14,627
| 28–5
|- align="center" bgcolor="#ccffcc"
| 34
| January 19
| @ Sacramento
| 
| Gary Payton (24)
| Michael Cage (9)
| Gary Payton (8)
| ARCO Arena17,317
| 29–5
|- align="center" bgcolor="#ccffcc"
| 35
| January 21
| @ Dallas
| 
| Detlef Schrempf (22)
| Shawn Kemp (12)
| Gary Payton (8)
| Reunion Arena14,101
| 30–5
|- align="center" bgcolor="#ffcccc"
| 36
| January 22
| @ Denver
| 
| Shawn Kemp (26)
| Shawn Kemp (12)
| Gary Payton (5)
| McNichols Sports Arena17,171
| 30–6
|- align="center" bgcolor="#ffcccc"
| 37
| January 24
| @ Utah
| 
| Gary Payton (18)
| Shawn Kemp (14)
| Gary Payton (7)
| Delta Center19,911
| 30–7
|- align="center" bgcolor="#ffcccc"
| 38
| January 25
| L.A. Clippers
| 
| Detlef Schrempf (19)
| Detlef Schrempf (12)
| Gary Payton (7)
| Seattle Center Coliseum14,348
| 30–8
|- align="center" bgcolor="#ccffcc"
| 39
| January 27
| New Jersey
| 
| Gary Payton (21)
| Shawn Kemp (11)
| Schrempf & McMillan (5)
| Seattle Center Coliseum14,490
| 31–8
|- align="center" bgcolor="#ffcccc"
| 40
| January 29
| New York
| 
| Gary Payton (19)
| Kemp & Cage (8)
| Payton & McMillan (5)
| Seattle Center Coliseum14,813
| 31–9

|- align="center" bgcolor="#ffcccc"
| 41
| February 1
| @ New Jersey
| 
| Shawn Kemp (26)
| Shawn Kemp (12)
| Schrempf & McMillan (7)
| Brendan Byrne Arena16,213
| 31–10
|- align="center" bgcolor="#ccffcc"
| 42
| February 2
| @ Boston
| 
| Detlef Schrempf (21)
| Shawn Kemp (11)
| Nate McMillan (8)
| Boston Garden14,890
| 32–10
|- align="center" bgcolor="#ccffcc"
| 43
| February 4
| @ Detroit
| 
| Kendall Gill (18)
| Shawn Kemp (11)
| Gary Payton (9)
| The Palace of Auburn Hills21,454
| 33–10
|- align="center" bgcolor="#ccffcc"
| 44
| February 5
| @ Milwaukee
| 
| Detlef Schrempf (18)
| Kemp & Cage (9)
| Gary Payton (10)
| Bradley Center18,633
| 34–10
|- align="center" bgcolor="#ccffcc"
| 45
| February 9
| Portland
| 
| Gary Payton (19)
| Shawn Kemp (19)
| Gary Payton (9)
| Seattle Center Coliseum14,813
| 35–10
|- style="text-align:center;"
| colspan="9" style="background:#bbcaff;"|All-Star Break
|- align="center" bgcolor="#ccffcc"
| 46
| February 15
| Philadelphia
| 
| Shawn Kemp (24)
| Shawn Kemp (13)
| Nate McMillan (8)
| Seattle Center Coliseum14,496
| 36–10
|- align="center" bgcolor="#ffcccc"
| 47
| February 17
| @ Miami
| 
| Schrempf & Kemp (22)
| Shawn Kemp (12)
| Gary Payton (5)
| Miami Arena15,200
| 36–11
|- align="center" bgcolor="#ffcccc"
| 48
| February 18
| @ Orlando
| 
| Kendall Gill (20)
| Gary Payton (8)
| Nate McMillan (6)
| Orlando Arena15,291
| 36–12
|- align="center" bgcolor="#ffcccc"
| 49
| February 20
| @ Indiana
| 
| Sam Perkins (24)
| Shawn Kemp (10)
| Nate McMillan (9)
| Market Square Arena16,586
| 36–13
|- align="center" bgcolor="#ccffcc"
| 50
| February 22
| @ New York
| 
| Shawn Kemp (21)
| Shawn Kemp (17)
| Payton & Askew (8)
| Madison Square Garden19,763
| 37–13
|- align="center" bgcolor="#ffcccc"
| 51
| February 23
| @ Atlanta
| 
| Gary Payton (23)
| Shawn Kemp (15)
| Shawn Kemp (6)
| The Omni16,368
| 37–14
|- align="center" bgcolor="#ccffcc"
| 52
| February 25
| Boston
| 
| Kendall Gill (25)
| Shawn Kemp (13)
| Vincent Askew (7)
| Seattle Center Coliseum14,813
| 38–14
|- align="center" bgcolor="#ccffcc"
| 53
| February 27
| @ L.A. Clippers
| 
| Shawn Kemp (27)
| Shawn Kemp (14)
| Gary Payton (8)
| Los Angeles Sports Arena15,080
| 39–14

|- align="center" bgcolor="#ccffcc"
| 54
| March 1
| Charlotte
| 
| Kendall Gill (21)
| Shawn Kemp (10)
| Four players (5)
| Seattle Center Coliseum14,813
| 40–14
|- align="center" bgcolor="#ccffcc"
| 55
| March 5
| Sacramento
| 
| Shawn Kemp (25)
| Shawn Kemp (14)
| Gary Payton (8)
| Seattle Center Coliseum14,677
| 41–14
|- align="center" bgcolor="#ccffcc"
| 56
| March 6
| @ Sacramento
| 
| Gary Payton (24)
| Shawn Kemp (11)
| Nate McMillan (6)
| ARCO Arena17,317
| 42–14
|- align="center" bgcolor="#ccffcc"
| 57
| March 8
| Golden State
| 
| Shawn Kemp (24)
| Shawn Kemp (14)
| Kendall Gill (10)
| Seattle Center Coliseum14,624
| 43–14
|- align="center" bgcolor="#ffcccc"
| 58
| March 10
| @ Houston
| 
| Gary Payton (19)
| Schrempf & Kemp (11)
| Detlef Schrempf (4)
| The Summit16,611
| 43–15
|- align="center" bgcolor="#ccffcc"
| 59
| March 11
| @ San Antonio
| 
| Shawn Kemp (23)
| Sam Perkins (8)
| Gary Payton (9)
| Alamodome20,640
| 44–15
|- align="center" bgcolor="#ccffcc"
| 60
| March 13
| Portland
| 
| Kendall Gill (23)
| Michael Cage (17)
| Payton & McMillan (8)
| Seattle Center Coliseum14,813
| 45–15
|- align="center" bgcolor="#ffcccc"
| 61
| March 15
| Detroit
| 
| Shawn Kemp (24)
| Shawn Kemp (11)
| Nate McMillan (9)
| Seattle Center Coliseum14,679
| 45–16
|- align="center" bgcolor="#ccffcc"
| 62
| March 17
| @ Minnesota
| 
| Shawn Kemp (21)
| Shawn Kemp (14)
| Gary Payton (6)
| Target Center17,581
| 46–16
|- align="center" bgcolor="#ffcccc"
| 63
| March 18
| @ Chicago
| 
| Kendall Gill (23)
| Shawn Kemp (9)
| Gary Payton (6)
| Chicago Stadium18,676
| 46–17
|- align="center" bgcolor="#ccffcc"
| 64
| March 20
| @ Charlotte
| 
| Gary Payton (32)
| Kemp & Schrempf (11)
| Shawn Kemp (12)
| Charlotte Coliseum23,698
| 47–17
|- align="center" bgcolor="#ccffcc"
| 65
| March 22
| San Antonio
| 
| Sam Perkins (27)
| Shawn Kemp (14)
| McMillan & Payton (6)
| Seattle Center Coliseum14,813
| 48–17
|- align="center" bgcolor="#ccffcc"
| 66
| March 24
| Phoenix
| 
| Detlef Schrempf (27)
| Shawn Kemp (13)
| Kendall Gill (10)
| Seattle Center Coliseum14,213
| 49–17
|- align="center" bgcolor="#ccffcc"
| 67
| March 26
| Minnesota
| 
| Detlef Schrempf (23)
| Schrempf & Kemp (7)
| Kendall Gill (9)
| Seattle Center Coliseum14,651
| 50–17
|- align="center" bgcolor="#ccffcc"
| 68
| March 28
| Denver
| 
| Gary Payton (23)
| Shawn Kemp (13)
| Three-Way Tie (6)
| Seattle Center Coliseum14,551
| 51–17
|- align="center" bgcolor="#ccffcc"
| 69
| March 29
| @ Portland
| 
| Shawn Kemp (28)
| Shawn Kemp (12)
| Gary Payton (9)
| Memorial Coliseum12,888
| 52–17
|- align="center" bgcolor="#ccffcc"
| 70
| March 31
| L.A. Lakers
| 
| Shawn Kemp (28)
| Shawn Kemp (12)
| Gill & Payton (4)
| Seattle Center Coliseum14,813
| 53–17

|- align="center" bgcolor="#ccffcc"
| 71
| April 2
| Golden State
| 
| Shawn Kemp (32)
| Shawn Kemp (12)
| Gary Payton (10)
| Seattle Center Coliseum14,812
| 54–17
|- align="center" bgcolor="#ccffcc"
| 72
| April 5
| Utah
| 
| Detlef Schrempf (17)
| Kemp & Perkins (8)
| Payton & McMillan (4)
| Seattle Center Coliseum14,813
| 55–17
|- align="center" bgcolor="#ffcccc"
| 73
| April 7
| @ Denver
| 
| Shawn Kemp (20)
| Shawn Kemp (12)
| Gill & McMillan (4)
| McNichols Sports Arena17,171
| 55–18
|- align="center" bgcolor="#ccffcc"
| 74
| April 8
| Dallas
| 
| Gary Payton (22)
| Shawn Kemp (13)
| Gary Payton (7)
| Seattle Center Coliseum14,551
| 56–18
|- align="center" bgcolor="#ccffcc"
| 75
| April 10
| Phoenix
| 
| Kendall Gill (29)
| Shawn Kemp (15)
| Kendall Gill (6)
| Seattle Center Coliseum14,813
| 57–18
|- align="center" bgcolor="#ccffcc"
| 76
| April 12
| @ L.A. Clippers
| 
| Kendall Gill (26)
| Shawn Kemp (14)
| Detlef Schrempf (8)
| Los Angeles Sports Arena11,160
| 58–18
|- align="center" bgcolor="#ccffcc"
| 77
| April 14
| L.A. Clippers
| 
| Detlef Schrempf (21)
| Shawn Kemp (12)
| Gary Payton (12)
| Seattle Center Coliseum14,604
| 59–18
|- align="center" bgcolor="#ccffcc"
| 78
| April 16
| Houston
| 
| Shawn Kemp (22)
| Shawn Kemp (17)
| Gary Payton (7)
| Seattle Center Coliseum14,813
| 60–18
|- align="center" bgcolor="#ffcccc"
| 79
| April 19
| @ Phoenix
| 
| Shawn Kemp (20)
| Shawn Kemp (11)
| Gary Payton (7)
| America West Arena19,023
| 60–19
|- align="center" bgcolor="#ccffcc"
| 80
| April 20
| @ L.A. Lakers
| 
| Shawn Kemp (23)
| Kemp & Perkins (11)
| Nate McMillan (9)
| Great Western Forum15,283
| 61–19
|- align="center" bgcolor="#ccffcc"
| 81
| April 22
| San Antonio
| 
| Ricky Pierce (26)
| Nate McMillan (9)
| McMillan & Schrempf (5)
| Seattle Center Coliseum14,813
| 62–19
|- align="center" bgcolor="#ccffcc"
| 82
| April 24
| @ Portland
| 
| Schrempf & Payton (18)
| Shawn Kemp (14)
| Three-Way Tie (4)
| Memorial Coliseum12,888
| 63–19

Playoffs

Game log

|- align="center" bgcolor="#ccffcc"
| 1
| April 28
| Denver
| W 106–82
| Detlef Schrempf (21)
| Kemp, Perkins (9)
| Gary Payton (7)
| Seattle Center Coliseum14,813
| 1–0
|- align="center" bgcolor="#ccffcc"
| 2
| April 30
| Denver
| W 97–87
| Gary Payton (18)
| Shawn Kemp (12)
| Shawn Kemp (6)
| Seattle Center Coliseum14,813
| 2–0
|- align="center" bgcolor="#ffcccc"
| 3
| May 2
| @ Denver
| L 93–110
| Detlef Schrempf (18)
| Detlef Schrempf (6)
| Gary Payton (5)
| McNichols Sports Arena17,171
| 2–1
|- align="center" bgcolor="#ffcccc"
| 4
| May 5
| @ Denver
| L 85–94 (OT)
| Payton, Schrempf (20)
| Shawn Kemp (13)
| Vincent Askew (5)
| McNichols Sports Arena17,171
| 2–2
|- align="center" bgcolor="#ffcccc"
| 5
| May 7
| Denver
| L 94–98 (OT)
| Kendall Gill (22)
| Shawn Kemp (12)
| Gary Payton (8)
| Seattle Center Coliseum14,813
| 2–3

Player statistics

Season

1. Statistics with the SuperSonics.

Playoffs

Awards and records

Awards
 Shawn Kemp earned an All-NBA Second Team selection.
 Gary Payton earned All-NBA Third Team and NBA All-Defensive First Team selections.
 Nate McMillan earned an All-Defensive Second Team selection and finished the season as leader in total steals and steals per game.
 Shawn Kemp and Gary Payton were both selected to play in the 1994 NBA All-Star Game for the West. It was Kemp's first start as an All-Star, and Payton's first appearance in an All-Star Game.

Records
 Team record for most victories in a single season (63)

Transactions

Overview

Trades

Free agents

Additions
{| cellspacing="0"
| valign="top" |

1. First of two 10-day contracts.

Player Transactions Citation:

See also
 1993–94 NBA season

References

Seattle
Seattle SuperSonics seasons